The Catavi Formation is a Pridoli to Emsian geologic formation of northern and central Bolivia.

Fossil content 
The formation has provided the following fossils:

 Andinodesma radicostata
 Antarctilamna seriponensis
 Australocoelia tourteloti
 Bolivacanthus sagitalis
 Burmeisteria herscheli
 Cingulochitina ceneratiensis, C. ervensis
 Clarkeia antisiensis
 Climatius enodiscosta
 Gomphonchus pluriformis
 Gyracanthus seriponensis
 Kazachstania gerardoi
 Leonaspis (Leonaspis) aracana
 Leonaspis (Leonaspis) berryi
 Leonaspis (? Leonaspis) chacaltayana
 Nodonchus rectus
 Odontochile andii
 Onchus punctuatus, O. sicaeformis
 Paciphacops waisfeldae
 Palaeoneilo unionoides
 Phacopina (Phacopina) chojnacotensis
 Sinacanthus boliviensis
 Turinia gondwana
 Andinacaste cf. legrandi
 Burmeisteria (Digonus) cf. noticus
 Calymene sp.
 Pleurodictyum sp.
 Trimerus sp.
 Acanthodii indet.
 Brachiopoda indet.
 Bryozoa indet.
 Cephalopoda indet.
 Gastropoda indet.
 Ischnacanthida indet.
 Ophiuroidea indet.
 Palaeotaxodonta indet.
 Tentaculitida indet.
 Trilobita indet.

See also 
 List of fossiliferous stratigraphic units in Bolivia

References

Further reading 
 G. D. Edgecombe and L. Ramskold. 1994. Earliest Devonian phacopide trilobites from central Bolivia. Paläontologische Zeitschrift 68(3/4):397-410
 P. Y. Gagnier, S. Turner, L. Friman, M. Suarez-Riglos, and P. Janvier. 1988. The Devonian vertebrate and mollusc fauna from Seripona (Dept. of Chiquisaca, Bolivia). Neues Jahrbuch für Geologie und Paläontologie, Abhandlungen 176(2):269-297
 U. Rehfeld and J. Mehl. 1989. Andinodesma radiata n. gen. n. sp., a grammysiid taxon from the Lower Devonian Catavi-Formation (Bolivia) and its autecological and phylogenetic implications. Paläontologische Zeitschrift 63(3/4):263-279
 

Geologic formations of Bolivia
Devonian System of South America
Silurian System of South America
Devonian Bolivia
Silurian Bolivia
Emsian Stage
Lochkovian Stage
Pragian Stage
Pridoli geology
Sandstone formations
Siltstone formations
Limestone formations
Shallow marine deposits
Devonian southern paleotemperate deposits
Silurian southern paleotemperate deposits
Paleontology in Bolivia
Formations
Formations